Robert Kendrick and Donald Young were the defending champions but decided not to participate.
Treat Conrad Huey and Dominic Inglot won the final 4–6, 6–3, [10–7] against John Paul Fruttero and Raven Klaasen.

Seeds

Draw

Draw

References
 Main Draw
 Qualifying Draw

Virginia National Bank Men's Pro Championship - Doubles
2011 Doubles